Lake Charter Township is a charter township of Berrien County in the U.S. state of Michigan. The population was 2,972 at the 2010 census.

The township is located in the west central portion of the county. Lake Michigan and the city of Bridgman are to the west, Lincoln Township to the north, Baroda Township to the east, Weesaw Township to the south, and Chikaming Township to the southwest.

Communities 
Browntown was a village in Lake Township that was platted in 1861. It no longer exists.
A post office was established in August 1890 and operated until July 1912.

In 1848, a village of 80 blocks was platted in section 25 with the name Livingston, but nothing became of it and it soon became farm property.

Geography

I-94 passes through the township, parallel to the Lake Michigan shore. Warren Dunes State Park is in the southwest of the township.

Demographics
As of the census of 2000, there were 3,148 people, 1,171 households, and 892 families residing in the township. The racial makeup of the township was 97.74% White, 0.67% African American, 0.29% Native American, 0.25% Asian, 0.03% Pacific Islander, 0.19% from other races, and 0.83% from two or more races. Hispanic or Latino of any race were 0.92% of the population.

There were 1,171 households, out of which 34.8% had children under the age of 18 living with them, 65.2% were married couples living together, 8.2% had a female householder with no husband present, and 23.8% were non-families. 21.0% of all households were made up of individuals, and 8.1% had someone living alone who was 65 years of age or older.  The average household size was 2.61 and the average family size was 3.02.

In the township the population was spread out, with 24.8% under the age of 18, 6.1% from 18 to 24, 28.9% from 25 to 44, 25.4% from 45 to 64, and 14.8% who were 65 years of age or older.  The median age was 40 years. For every 100 females, there were 95.4 males.  For every 100 females age 18 and over, there were 95.3 males.

The median income for a household in the township was $49,764, and the median income for a family was $57,228. Males had a median income of $41,673 versus $26,531 for females. The per capita income for the township was $21,666.  About 6.4% of families and 8.7% of the population were below the poverty line, including 10.8% of those under age 18 and 13.3% of those age 65 or over.

References

Notes

Citations

Sources

External links
Lake Charter Township official website

Townships in Berrien County, Michigan
Charter townships in Michigan